Ligusticum canadense, known by the common names of American lovage, boar hog root, and Canadian licorice-root, is a member of the carrot family, Apiaceae. It is native to the eastern United States, primarily in Missouri, Tennessee, Georgia, and North Carolina. Despite its name, the northern range of L. canadense remains hundreds of miles south of the Canadian border.

References

External links

canadense
Flora of Missouri
Flora of Arkansas
Flora of Alabama
Flora of Georgia (U.S. state)
Flora of South Carolina
Flora of Tennessee
Flora of North Carolina
Flora of Kentucky
Flora of Virginia
Species described in 1753
Species described in 1894
Taxa named by Carl Linnaeus